Horizon was a magazine published in the United States from 1958 to 1989.  Originally published by American Heritage as a bi-monthly hardback, Horizon was subtitled A Magazine of the Arts.  In 1978, Boone Inc. bought the magazine, which continued to cover the arts.  Publication ceased in March 1989. Recently, American Heritage announced its intention to digitize essays from past issues.

American Heritage years
The history magazine and book publisher American Heritage began Horizon: A Magazine of the Arts as a hardback bi-monthly in September 1958.  The editor was Joseph J. Thorndike Jr., with James Parton as publisher.  Contributors in the early years included:

James Agee-author
Cleveland Amory-author and commentator 
John Ashbery-poet and critic
Fernand Auberjonois-journalist
Louis Auchincloss-lawyer, novelist, historian
W.H. Auden-poet
Carlos Baker-literary critic 
Correlli Barnett-historian
Jacques Barzun-historian
Saul Bellow-writer
Ingmar Bergman-filmmaker 
Charles Berlitz-linguist
Morris Bishop-historian
Lesley Blanch-writer and historian
Fawm M. Brodie-historian
Ronald Blythe-writer
Marie Boas Hall-historian
Jacob Bronowski-historian, television commentator
Frances M. Brown-artist, painter
Robert Brustein-drama critic 
Anthony Burgess-novelist
Joseph Campbell-mythologist and writer
John Canaday-critic, art historian
Lionel Casson-classicist
Arthur C. Clarke-science fiction writer, futurist
Henry Steele Commager-historian
Malcolm Cowley-novelist, poet, literary critic
Basil Davidson-historian
Marshall B. Davidson-historian
Agnes De Mille-dancer
Rene Dubos-microbiologist and writer
Loren Eiseley-anthropolist and writer
Sir John Elliott-historian
Timothy Foote-writer and editor
Alfred Frankenstein-art and music critic
Antonia Fraser-novelist and biographer
John Kenneth Galbraith-economist
Vicki Goldberg-critic, author, photo historian
Paul Goldberger-architectural critic
Stephen Jay Gould-biologist and historian of science
Robert Graves-poet and writer
Geoffrey Grigson-essayist
Henry Anatole Grunwald-journalist and editor
Emily Hahn-journalist and author
William Harlan Hale-writer and editor
Gerald Heard-public intellectual, historian, cultural theorist
Gilbert Highet-essayist
Jamake Highwater-writer and journalist
Paul Horgan-author and historian
Robert Hughes-critic, television commentator
Julian Huxley-biologist
Ada Louise Huxtable-architectural critic
Paul Johnson-journalist, historian, speechwriter
Walter Karp-journalist, historian, writer 
Murray Kempton-journalist, social and political commentator
Arthur Koestler-author, journalist
Irving Kristol-columnist, journalist, writer 
Anthony Lewis- public intellectual, journalist
Margery Lewis- photographer and writer
John Lukacs-historian
Russell Lynes-art critic
Harold Macmillan -British politician
D. M. Marshman Jr.-screenwriter 
Garrett Mattingly-historian
W. Somerset Maugham-playwright, novelist, short story writer
Charles L. Mee Jr.-playwright and historian
Thomas Meehan-essayist
Leonard B. Meyer-composer
James A. Michener-novelist
Nancy Mitford-novelist, biographer, journalist
Herbert Mitgang-author, editor, playwright, television producer
Jan Morris-travel writer (as both James and Jan Morris)
Lance Morrow-essayist and writer
Lewis Mumford-historian, sociologist, philosopher, literary critic
Ogden Nash-poet and cartoonist
Frank O'Hara-poet and writer
Régine Pernoud-French historian and archivist
George Plimpton-writer
J. H. Plumb-historian
Raymond Postgate-author, social historian, novelist, gourmet
J. B. Priestley-novelist and playwright
V. S. Pritchett-writer and literary critic
Edwin O. Reischauer-educator and historian
Bernard Rudofsky-writer, architect, collector, designer
John Russell-art critic
Carl Sagan-astronomer, writer, television commentator
Richard Schickel-critic
Harold C. Schonberg-music critic
Erich Segal-educator, novelist
Tim Severin-travel writer
Israel Shenker-critic
Red Smith-sports writer
Jean Stafford-novelist
Freya Stark-travel writer
Roger Starr-planning official, author, editorial writer
Francis Steegmuller-biographer, translator, fiction writer
Wallace Stegner-novelist, environmentalist
Irving Stone-essayist
Igor Stravinsky-composer
W. A. Swanberg-historian
Allan Temko-architectural critic
James Thurber-humorist
Alvin Toffler-writer and futurist
Arnold J. Toynbee-historian
Hugh Trevor-Roper-historian
Kurt Vonnegut Jr.-novelist
C. V. (Dame Victoria) Wedgwood-historian
Lynn Townsend White Jr.-historian
Theodore H. White-politician journalist, historian
P. G. Wodehouse-novelist
William Zinsser- writer, editor, literary critic, teacher

While Horizon remained bi-monthly up to July 1962, volume IV, there was an anomalous volume V that had eight issues. After November 1963, there were only four issues a year, and the magazine changed its issue dates to the current season rather than a month. This is shown in Linda Prestwidge's master table of contents for hard cover Horizon issues in the reference link below. From Winter 1964, volume VI, to January 1977, volume XIX, Horizon produced four issues a year which are still prized by collectors and actively traded on the Internet.

The May 1977 issue contained an insert from the publisher, Rhett Austell, informing the subscribers that Horizon would become a monthly magazine in soft cover. The reason was plainly financial. Horizon was not able to attract enough subscribers to maintain the luxury magazine devoted to the arts and history that had been envisioned by Thorndike and Parton. Austell referred in this insert to "a time of inflationary prices" and announced that Otto Fuerbringer, a former editor at Time magazine, had been hired as editor of Horizon.  There was an editorial in this issue describing the changes in the quality of the printing, binding, and content imposed by the shorter time between issues.

The July 1977 issue, volume XIX, number 4, had another insert from the publisher confirming that this would be the last hard-cover issue.  The response from the subscribers to the lower quality of printing and binding and a new emphasis on current events was overwhelmingly negative, resulting in the sale of Horizon to Boone, Inc. a year later.

American Heritage also published books under the Horizon name, such as 1961's Horizon Book of the Renaissance, edited by Richard M. Ketchum and written by Plumb, with contributors including Trevor Roper, Kenneth Clark, Iris Origo and Jacob Bronowski..

Boone years
In December 1978, publication of Horizon moved from New York City, New York, to Tuscaloosa, Alabama, and the magazine changed to a softcover format, published monthly. The new owner was Boone Inc., with editor and publisher Gray D. Boone. Contributors included Robert Joffrey, Alan Rich, Lanford Wilson, Ray Bradbury and Brendan Gill.  Publication ceased eleven years later, with volume 32, number 2, March/April 1989.

References

External links
Horizon magazine website
Horizon (1959-1978) Website containing extracts from articles in the magazine.
Horizon table of contents 1959–1977

1958 establishments in New York (state)
1989 disestablishments in the United States
Bimonthly magazines published in the United States
Defunct literary magazines published in the United States
English-language magazines
Magazines established in 1958
Magazines disestablished in 1989
Magazines published in New York (state)
Magazines published in Alabama
Tuscaloosa, Alabama